South Fremantle is a suburb of Perth, Western Australia, located within the City of Fremantle.

History
The first development in the area may have been when Richard Goldsmith Meares established a lime-burning kiln in 1831.  Meares had arrived at the Swan River Colony with Thomas Peel in the previous year.

As the area was adjacent to the relatively safe harbour of Owen's Anchorage in Cockburn Sound, the area began to be used as an alternative destination point for ship arrivals.

In 1898, a railway was built from Fremantle to Robb Jetty. At that time, an abattoir was built for slaughter of livestock arriving from the north-west of the state including the Kimberley Region.  Livestock were unloaded from the ships onto a jetty.  Extensive pasturing for the animals as well as small market gardens were established in the region around the abattoir.

The Coogee Hotel was built in 1901, and in 1903 the railway was extended to Woodman Point. Commercial lime kilns were established during this period to provide for the construction boom and population growth which had been brought about by gold discoveries.  The Newmarket Hotel on the border of Hamilton Hill and South Fremantle, was often identified as being in either  of the suburbs.

The area steadily became the centre of much of Perth's heavy industry and comprised the coal-fired power station, railway marshalling yards, abattoir as well as numerous skin drying sheds. From the 1980s however, pressures brought on by demands for residential housing triggered a process of removal of the various facilities.

South Beach
South Beach is an area of beach and adjacent land in South Fremantle. The beach and the disused railway station are parts of the South Fremantle community history.

Industrial heritage

Railway marshalling yards
A large marshalling yard with signal box tower was built by Western Australian Government Railways in the 1960s during the standard gauge railway line project from Kalgoorlie to Leighton.

The yard was decommissioned in the Westrail era in the 1990s.

Robb Jetty Abattoir
See Robbs Jetty Abattoir

Public transport
South Fremantle is serviced by bus routes 511, 530, 531, 532, 533, 548, 549, 998, 999 and the Fremantle Central Area Transit (CAT).

References

External links

 
Suburbs of Perth, Western Australia
Suburbs in the City of Fremantle
Lime kilns in Australia